Salvadori's nightjar (Caprimulgus pulchellus) is a species of nightjar in the family Caprimulgidae. It is endemic to Indonesia, where it is found in Sumatra and Java.

Its natural habitats are subtropical or tropical moist lowland forests and subtropical or tropical moist montane forests. It is threatened by habitat loss.

References

Salvadori's nightjar
Birds of Sumatra
Birds of Java
Salvadori's nightjar
Taxonomy articles created by Polbot